is a former Japanese football player and manager.

Coaching career
Kato was born in Kume District, Okayama on January 29, 1951. He joined Vissel Kobe in 1995, and he managed youth team. In October 1997, top team manager Stuart Baxter was sacked end of 1997 season. Kato managed the club as caretaker in Emperor's Cup in December. In 2004, manager Ivan Hašek resigned in September and Kato became a new manager in October. He managed 7 matches until end of 2004 season.

Managerial statistics

References

External links

jsgoal.jp

1951 births
Living people
Osaka University of Health and Sport Sciences alumni
Association football people from Okayama Prefecture
Japanese footballers
Japanese football managers
J1 League managers
Vissel Kobe managers
Association footballers not categorized by position